in Tokyo is the largest municipal cemetery in Japan. It is split between the cities of Fuchu and Koganei within the Tokyo Metropolis. It is one of the largest green areas in Tokyo.

History 
Around 1900, Tokyo had five public cemeteries - Aoyama, Somei, Yanaka, Zoshigaya and Kameido. As the population of Tokyo grew, and cemetery space grew scarce, there was a need to build a cemetery outside of the city limits of Tokyo. In 1919, city park manager Kiyoshi Inoshita issued a plan to establish a large park/cemetery to the north, east and west of Tokyo. Tama, to the west of Tokyo, was selected in 1920, with construction started two years later. It was said that the site was chosen because of access to transportation infrastructure, such as the Kōshū Kaidō, Keiō Line, Seibu Tamagawa Line, and Chūō Main Line. The cemetery was opened in 1923. The planned northern and eastern cemeteries are Sodaira and Yahashira, respectively.

In 1934, Gensui The Marquis Tōgō, the naval war hero, was buried in Tama Cemetery, spreading the popularity of the cemetery.  During World War II, Kawasaki Ki-61 from nearby Chofu Airfield were hidden and repaired in the cemetery. Some facilities in the cemetery still have bullet holes from U.S. strafing.

Use of the cemetery increased, with the last open spot used in 1963. Since 1963, only reburials and other such uses have opened up new spaces. In 1962 a green lawn-type cemetery was added, and in 1993, Mitama Hall, a columbarium, was added.

Notable interments

 Aikawa Yoshisuke (1880-1967), the founder and first president of the Nissan zaibatsu between 1931 and 1945
 General Anami Korechika (1887-1945), a senior commander in the Imperial Japanese Army during World War II, and War Minister at the surrender of Japan. Although outspoken against the Japanese surrender to Allied forces in 1945, he is noted for his stance against the Kyūjō coup attempt. His sense of honour and respect for the emperor's wish to end the war, left him no choice but to commit seppuku the morning after signing the surrender documents. 
 General Baron Araki Sadao (1877-1966), a senior commander in the Imperial Japanese Army before World War II and one of the principal nationalist right-wing political theorists in the late Japanese Empire
 Arita Hachirō (1884-1965), the Minister for Foreign Affairs for three terms, who is believed to have originated the concept of the Greater East Asia Co-Prosperity Sphere
 Azuma Ryōtarō (1893-1983), Governor of Tokyo from 1959 to 1967
 Vice Admiral Fukudome Shigeru (1891-1971), a senior commander in the Imperial Japanese Navy during World War II
 Lt-General Furushō Motoo (1882-1940), a senior commander in the Imperial Japanese Army
 Baron Tanaka Giichi (1864-1929), a general in the Imperial Japanese Army, and the 26th Prime Minister of Japan from 20 April 1927 to 2 July 1929
 Hara Shūjirō (1871-1934), a politician who served as Minister for Colonial Affairs in the Empire of Japan
 General Hayashi Senjūrō (1876-1943), the Imperial Japanese Army commander of the Chosen Army of Japan in Korea during the Mukden Incident and the invasion of Manchuria, and 33rd Prime Minister of Japan from 2 February 1937 to 4 June 1937
 Gensui The Marquis Tōgō Heihachirō (1848-1934), a Gensui (or 'marshal-admiral') in the Imperial Japanese Navy and one of Japan's greatest naval heroes
 Baron Honjō Shigeru (1876-1945), a general in the Imperial Japanese Army during the early period of the Second Sino-Japanese War
 General Ichinohe Hyoe (1855-1931), a senior commander in the Imperial Japanese Army

 Ino Hiroya (1891-1980), a politician and cabinet minister in Japan
 Lt-General Inoue Masakichi (1886-1975), a senior commander in the Imperial Japanese Army during World War II
 Admiral Inoue Shigeyoshi (1889-1975), a senior commander in the Imperial Japanese Navy during World War II and a Vice-Minister of the Navy
 Kanemitsu Tsuneo (1877-1955), politician and cabinet minister in the Empire of Japan
 Lt-General Kawagishi Bunzaburō (1882-1957), a senior commander in the Imperial Japanese Army during the early stages of the Second Sino-Japanese War
 Baron Den Kenjirō (1855-1930), a cabinet minister in the pre-war government of the Empire of Japan and the 8th Japanese Governor-General of Taiwan from October 29, 1919 to September 1923
 Baron Hiranuma Kiichirō (1867-1952), a prominent pre–World War II right-wing Japanese politician and the 35th Prime Minister of Japan from 5 January 1939 to 30 August 1939
 Kinoshita Mokutarō (1885-1945), a Japanese author, Dramaturge, poet, art historian and literary critic
 Kishida Ryūsei (1891-1929), a Taishō and Shōwa period painter
 Kitagawa Fuyuhiko (1900-1990), a Japanese poet and film critic
 Count Kodama Hideo (1876-1947), a politician, and wartime cabinet minister in the Empire of Japan
 Gensui Koga Mineichi (1885-1944), a commander-in-chief of the Imperial Japanese Navy's Combined Fleet
 Kurata Hyakuzō (1891-1943), a Japanese essayist and playwright on religious subjects that was active during the Taishō and early Shōwa periods
 Vice Admiral Kurita Takeo (1889-1977), a senior commander in the Imperial Japanese Navy during World War II
 Matsuda Genji (1876-1936), a politician and cabinet minister in the Empire of Japan
 Mishima Tokushichi (1893-1975), a Japanese metallurgist

 Mishima Yukio (1925-1970), a Japanese author, poet, playwright, actor, and film director
 Nakajima Chikuhei (1884-1949), founder of the Nakajima Aircraft Company and a cabinet minister for several posts
 Noda Kōgo (1893-1968), a Japanese screenwriter most famous for collaborating with film director Ozu Yasujirō
 Admiral Okada Keisuke (1868-1952), senior naval commander who served as the 31st Prime Minister of Japan from 8 July 1934 to 9 March 1936
 Lt-General Sakurai Shōzō (1889-1985), a senior commander in the Imperial Japanese Army during the Second Sino-Japanese War and World War II
 Admiral Baron Kataoka Shichirō (1854-1920), an early senior commander in the Imperial Japanese Navy

 Richard Sorge (1895-1944), a German communist and spy who worked for the Soviet Union
 Victor Starffin (1916-1957), the first professional baseball pitcher in Japan to win three hundred games
 Gensui Sugiyama Hajime (1880-1945), Chief of the Imperial Army General Staff Office and, later, Minister of War in the Imperial Japanese Government during World War II between 1937 and 1944
 Taniguchi Masaharu (1893-1985), a Japanese New Thought leader, founder of the Seicho-no-Ie religious movement
 Lt-General Tatekawa Yoshitsugu (1880-1945), a senior commander in the Imperial Japanese Army in World War II and ambassador to the Soviet Union that concluded the 1941 Soviet-Japanese Neutrality Pact
 Tokonami Takejirō (1866-1935), a Japanese politician who served as Home Minister and Railway Minister
 Tomoyuki Yamashita (1885-1946), a Japanese general, dubbed "The Tiger of Malaya", executed for war crimes
 Gensui The Marquis Saigō Tsugumichi (1843-1902), a Japanese politician and admiral in the Meiji Period
 Admiral Tsukahara Nishizō (1887-1966), a senior commander in the Imperial Japanese Navy during World War II

 Uchimura Kanzō (1861-1930),  author, Christian evangelist, and the founder of the Non-church Movement in the Meiji and Taishō period
 General Ugaki Kazushige (1868-1956), a senior commander in the Imperial Japanese Army, the 5th principal of Takushoku University, and twice Governor-General of Korea
 General Ushiroku Jun (1884-1973), a senior commander in the Imperial Japanese Army
 Vice Admiral Baron Shibayama Yahachi (1850-1927), a senior commander in the early Imperial Japanese Navy
 Yamamoto Jōtarō (1867-1936), a bureaucrat, politician and entrepreneur in late Meiji and early Taishō period
 Yamahata Yōsuke (1917-1966), a Japanese photographer best known for extensively photographing Nagasaki the day after it was bombed

 Gensui Yamamoto Isoroku (1884-1943), a Japanese Marshal Admiral and the commander-in-chief of the Combined Fleet during World War II
 Yosano Akiko (1878- 1942), Japanese author, poet, pioneering feminist, pacifist, and social reformer
 Admiral Yoshida Zengo (1885-1966), a senior commander in the Imperial Japanese Navy during World War II
 General Kusunose Yukihiko (1858-1927), a senior commander in the early Imperial Japanese Army
 Shōhei Ōoka (1909-1988), novelist, literary critic, and translator of French literature. Best known for Nobi (Fires on the Plain, 1951).
 Edogawa Ranpo (1894-1965),  Japanese author and critic who played a major role in the development of Japanese mystery fiction.
 Machiko Soga (1938-2006), Japanese voice actress and actress best known for her villainous roles in tokusatsu
 Jun Seba (1974-2010), Japanese record producer, DJ, composer, and arranger, better known by his stage name Nujabes
 Rash Behari Bose (1886–1945), Indian Revolutionary Activist and Father of Shinjuku Nakamuraya "Indian Curry" West Bengal
 Yasuo Yamada (1932-1995), Japanese singer, narrator and voice actor. Known for voicing Lupin III and for the Japanese dubbing of Kermit the Frog and Clint Eastwood.
 Seiichirō Yasui (1891-1962), Japanese politician and bureaucrat who served as Governor of Tokyo from 1947 to 1959.

See also 

 Tama-Reien Station on the Keiō Line

References

External links 
 Tokyo Metropolitan Park Association site 
 Tama Cemetery site 

Cemeteries in Japan
Parks and gardens in Tokyo
Koganei, Tokyo
1923 establishments in Japan